National Tertiary Route 802, or just Route 802 (or ) is a National Road Route of Costa Rica, located in the Limón province.

Description
In Limón province the route covers Limón canton (Matama district).

Junction list
The entire route is in Matama district.

References

Highways in Costa Rica